Regilio is both a surname and given name. Notable people with the name include:

Nick Regilio (born 1978), American baseball pitcher
Regilio Jacobs (born 1987), Dutch football
Regilio Seedorf, Dutch footballer from Suriname
Regilio Tuur (born 1967), Dutch boxer

See also
Regillio